Warner's Christmas Celebration is an annual night-time Christmas event which is held at Warner Bros. Movie World across selected nights in December.

History

Looney Tunes Christmas
Following the success of their first Halloween Family Fun Night in 2006, Warner Bros. Movie World ran a one-off Looney Tunes Christmas event on 23 December 2006. The event featured a Christmas parade and Looney Tunes shows. In 2007, an extended Halloween Family Fun line-up returned but the Christmas event was discontinued.

White Christmas
On 30 December 2009, the Gold Coast Bulletin reported a variety of new attractions for the Gold Coast theme parks for 2010. This report detailed that Movie World had plans to create a White Christmas event with one million Christmas lights and artificial snow. In June 2010, Warner Bros. Movie World's main competitor, Dreamworld announced that they would be operating Winter Wonderland during the June/July school holidays. Dreamworld's event featured an ice slide and a snowball area alongside their Illuminate Light & Laser Spectacular. No further details of Warner Bros. Movie World's White Christmas event were released until late 2010. Through their website and several television commercials they announced the event will be a separate ticketed event on eight nights in December and will feature one million Christmas lights, Polar Express 4-D Experience, Looney Tunes on Ice, Ice Skating for guests, Christmas carollers, snow and a Christmas parade. 

The first White Christmas event was held as a charity event on 3 December 2010 for 3,000 disadvantaged children and their families. The following two weeks the event was held on Thursday through to Sunday for VIP pass holders and event ticket holders. Due to the unexpected success of the event, an additional night was added to the line up on Monday 20 December. In addition a day time Christmas parade with snow was held on 21–23 December during park hours for all guests.

The event returned in 2011 with another charity event on 9 December 2011. The nine nights to follow (i.e. 10–18 December) were open to the public. Unlike the 2010 event, guests were forced to pre-book.

Just like the previous two years, White Christmas began in 2012 with a charity event on 9 December. The event was planned to run for six nights: 14–16 and 21–23 December; however, this was later expanded to include 18–20 December as well. The Polar Express 4-D Experience was replaced with Ice Age Mammoth Christmas 4-D.

Attractions

Gallery

See also
 List of events held at Warner Bros. Movie World
 Fright Nights

References

External links
 

Warner Bros. Global Brands and Experiences entertainment